Mark Spalding (born 1958) is an English actor from Birmingham.

He began acting in 1984. He is perhaps best known for his role as Chief Inspector Paul Stritch in the long running ITV drama The Bill. He has also played policemen in Fallen Angel, Hustle, Outnumbered and Prime Suspect. Other TV work has included Dalziel and Pascoe and Heartbeat, a variety of roles for the highly successful Guy Jenkins and Andy Hamilton comedy team in Drop the Dead Donkey, Lord of Misrule, Gobble, Jeffrey Archer, The Truth. He has also appeared in the films Sleepy Hollow and Tomorrow Never Dies. He also has appeared many times on the stage, in Lancaster, Manchester, Leeds, Chester, Keswick and the West End. Mark was a founder member of the Metro Theatre Company, a new writing company based in Sheffield in the 1980s.

Filmography

External links

1958 births
English male television actors
Living people